Kanniyin Kathali is a 1949 Indian Tamil-language romantic comedy film directed by K. Ramnoth, who produced it with A. K. Sekhar and wrote the screenplay. An adaption of the play Twelfth Night by William Shakespeare, it stars Madhuri Devi, Anjali Devi and S. A. Natarajan. The film revolves around the twins Adithan and Chandrika, who are separated in a shipwreck. Chandrika (who is disguised as a man) falls in love with Prince Vasanthakumar, who in turn is in love with Megala Devi. Upon meeting Chandrika, Megala falls in love with her, thinking she is a man. Kanniyin Kathali was released on 6 August 1949.

Plot 
Prince Adithan and his twin sister Princess Chandrika are separated in a shipwreck. Chandrika is shipwrecked on the coast of the Vasanthapuri Kingdom and she comes ashore with the help of a fisherman. She loses contact with Adithan, whom she believes had drowned. Disguising herself as a young man under the name "Kalaimani", she enters the service of Prince Vasanthakumar's palace, who posed at the Royal Poetry Position.

Vasanthakumar has convinced himself that he in love with Megala Devi, whose father and brother have recently died and who refuses to see charming things, be in the company of man and entertain lover or marriage proposals from anyone (Vasanthakumar included), until seven years have passed. Vasanthakumar then uses "Kalaimani" as an intermediary to profess his passionate love before Megala. However, forgetting about the seven years in his case, falls in love with Kalaimani as she does not realise Vasanthakumar's messenger is a woman in disguise.

Meanwhile, Chandrika has fallen love with Vasanthakumar, creating a love triangle between the trio: Chandrika loves Vasanthakumar, Vasanthakumar loves Megala, and Megala loves "Kalaimani", not knowing it is Chandrika. Adithan arrives in Vasanthapuri, adding to confusion of mistaken identity. Mistaking Adithan for Kalaimani, Megala asks him to marry her. Finally, when Kalaimani and Adithan appear in the presence of both Megala and Vasanthakumar, there is more wonder and confusion at their similarity. At this point, Chandrika reveals her disguise and that Adithan is her twin brother. This ends in declaration of marriage between Vasanthakumar, who marries Chandrika and Adithan, who marries Megala.

Cast 

Male cast
 S. A. Natarajan as Vasanthakumar
 K. R. Ramsingh as Durjayan
 K. Sarangapani as Anna Alanakara Bhoopathi
 Pulimoottai Ramasami Iyer as Mama
 K. Sayeeram as Wise Man
 Nat Annaji Rao as Satyavanathan
 M. K. Mustafa as Sailor
 E. R. Sahadevan as Kirthivarman
 C. P. Kittan as Kambhodi
 M. R. Santhanam as Varali
 C. V. V. Panthulu as Sanyasi

Female cast
 Anjali Devi as Megala
 Madhuri Devi as Adithan, Kalaimani, Chandrika
 M. S. Sivabhagyam as Singaram
Dance
 Lalitha & Padmini

Production 
In 1947, K. Ramnoth and A. K. Sekhar resigned from Gemini Studios. They were invited by M. Somasundaram to join his company Jupiter Pictures, and accepted. The first project they made for Jupiter was Kanniyin Kathali, an adaptation of the William Shakespeare play Twelfth Night. Ramnoth and Sekhar jointly produced the film, with the former also serving as director and screenwriter, and the latter as art director. S. D. Sundaram wrote the dialogues, W. R. Subba Rao handled the cinematography and T. Durairaj was the editor.

Soundtrack 
Music by S. M. Subbaiah Naidu and C. R. Subbaraman, while lyrics were written by Bhoomi Balagadas, Kannadasan and K. D. Santhanam. This was the cinematic debut of Kannadasan, and the first song he wrote was "Kalangaathiru Manamey".

Release and reception 
Kanniyin Kathali was released on 6 August 1949. According to historian Randor Guy, the film was not as commercially successful as expected to be; he believed this was due to the changing trends in Tamil cinema of that time, with audiences no longer being interested in films about royalty, though another historian S. Theodore Baskaran said the film was indeed a success.

References

External links 
 

1940s historical comedy films
1940s Tamil-language films
1949 films
1949 romantic comedy films
Cross-dressing in Indian films
Films about royalty
Films about siblings
Films based on Twelfth Night
Films based on works by William Shakespeare
Films scored by C. R. Subbaraman
Films directed by K. Ramnoth
Films scored by S. M. Subbaiah Naidu
Films set in 1949
Indian black-and-white films
Indian films based on plays
Indian historical comedy films
Indian romantic comedy films
Jupiter Pictures films
Twins in Indian films